Golden Fiddles is a 1994 Australian mini series based on the novel by Mary Grant Bruce. It was shot from 23 July to 16 September 1991 and was re-edited into a TV movie in 1994.

Cast
 Kate Nelligan - Anne Balfour
 John Bach - Walter Balfour
 Rachel Friend - Kitty Balfour
 Cameron Daddo - Norman Balfour
 David Reyne - Jack Greville
 Justine Clarke - Liddy Powell
 Pippa Grandison - Elsa Balfour
 Hamish Fletcher - Bob Balfour
 David Whitney - Adrian Treherne
 Charles Mayer - Philippe Allard
 Edmund Pegge - Mr. Craig
 Penne Hackforth-Jones - Mrs. Craig
 Mouche Phillips - Daphne Craig
 Gil Tucker - Sam Briggs
 Oriana Panozzo - Mrs. Briggs
 Gerda Nicolson - Miss. Birrell

References

External links

1990s Australian television miniseries
1991 Australian television series debuts
1991 Australian television series endings
Television shows set in South Australia